Bomberman 2 (Custom Battler Bomberman in Japan) is a video game for the Nintendo DS. Part of the Bomberman franchise, it is the sequel to the 2005 DS game. The game takes place in a cyberspace-like setting. Bomberman collects various bits of armor, allowing players to customize the character with unique power ups and skills.

2008 video games
2
Nintendo DS games
Nintendo DS-only games
Multiplayer and single-player video games
Video games developed in Japan

Hudson Soft games
Action video games